Milan Pacanda (born 28 February 1978 in Brno) is a retired Czech football forward who played for numerous clubs in the Czech Republic, Austria, Kazakhstan and Slovakia, but is most notable for over a decade spent with Brno.

References

External links
 
 
 Milan Pacanda at Eurofotbal.cz 
 

1978 births
Living people
Footballers from Brno
Association football midfielders
Czech footballers
Czech Republic under-21 international footballers
Czech First League players
Austrian Football Bundesliga players
Kazakhstan Premier League players
2. Liga (Slovakia) players
FC Wacker Innsbruck (2002) players
AC Sparta Prague players
FC Zbrojovka Brno players
FC Fastav Zlín players
FC Shakhter Karagandy players
FK Bodva Moldava nad Bodvou players
1. SC Znojmo players
Expatriate footballers in Austria
Czech expatriate sportspeople in Austria
Expatriate footballers in Kazakhstan
Czech expatriate sportspeople in Kazakhstan
Expatriate footballers in Slovakia
Czech expatriate sportspeople in Slovakia